Transforming growth factor, beta receptor II (70/80kDa) is a TGF beta receptor. TGFBR2 is its human gene.

It is a tumor suppressor gene.

Function 

This gene encodes a member of the serine/threonine protein kinase family and the TGFB receptor subfamily. The encoded protein is a transmembrane protein that has a protein kinase domain, forms a heterodimeric complex with another receptor protein, and binds TGF-beta. This receptor/ligand complex phosphorylates proteins, which then enter the nucleus and regulate the transcription of a subset of genes related to cell proliferation. Mutations in this gene have been associated with Marfan syndrome, Loeys-Deitz aortic aneurysm syndrome, Osler–Weber–Rendu syndrome, and the development of various types of tumors. At least 73 disease-causing mutations in this gene have been discovered. Alternatively spliced transcript variants encoding different isoforms have been characterized.

Interactions 

TGF beta receptor 2 has been shown to interact with:

 AP2B1, 
 Cyclin B2, 
 Endoglin, 
 Heat shock protein 90kDa alpha (cytosolic), member A1 
 STRAP,
 TGF beta receptor 1,  and
 Transforming growth factor, beta 3.

Domain architecture

TGF beta receptor 2 consists of a C-terminal protein kinase domain and an N-terminal ectodomain. The ectodomain consists of a compact fold containing nine beta-strands and a single helix stabilised by a network of six intra strand disulphide bonds. The folding topology includes a central five-stranded antiparallel beta-sheet, eight-residues long at its centre, covered by a second layer consisting of two segments of two-stranded antiparallel beta-sheets (beta1-beta4, beta3-beta9).

See also 
 TGF beta receptors

References

External links 
  GeneReviews/NIH/NCBI/UW entry on Thoracic Aortic Aneurysms and Aortic Dissections

TGF beta receptors
Tumor suppressor genes